Carlota Sosa Pietri (born 21 February 1957) is a Spanish-born Venezuelan actress known for her participation in various RCTV and Venevisión telenovelas. She is currently married to fellow actor Rafael Romero.

Filmography

References

External links

Galeria de Carlota Sosa at 

1957 births
Actresses from Madrid
Spanish emigrants to Venezuela
Venezuelan telenovela actresses
Living people